Shanna L. Peeples is the Dr. John G. O’Brien Distinguished Chair in Education at West Texas A&M University. She was the 2015 National Teacher of the Year.

Education 
Peeples has a B.A. in English from West Texas A&M University (1997), an M.Ed. from the University of Texas at Arlington (2013), and a Ph.D from Harvard University (2020).

Career 

Peeples had multiple jobs before she began teaching, starting with a 7th grade class. By 2011 she was teaching at Palo Duro High School in Texas. In 2015, Peeples was named National Teacher of the Year, and was presented her award by President Barack Obama. In 2020 she was named the Dr. John G. O’Brien Distinguished Chair in Education at West Texas A&M University.

Peeples has spoken against arming teachers in the classroom and advocates for LGBT marriage.

Selected publications

References 

Living people
West Texas A&M University alumni
University of Texas at Arlington alumni
Harvard University alumni
Women educators
West Texas A&M University faculty
Year of birth missing (living people)